Claudia Fassaert (born 11 July 1970, in Hontenisse, Netherlands) is a Belgian Olympic dressage rider. Representing Belgium, she competed at the 2012 Summer Olympics in London where she finished 27th in the individual competition.

She also competed at two World Equestrian Games (in 2010 and 2014) and at two European Dressage Championships (in 2011 and 2013). Her current best championship result 7th place in team dressage from the 2011 European Dressage Championship while her current best individual result is 14th place in freestyle dressage from the same championship.

References

External links
 

Living people
1970 births
Belgian female equestrians
Belgian dressage riders
Equestrians at the 2012 Summer Olympics
Olympic equestrians of Belgium
21st-century Belgian women